Open Service Mesh (OSM) is a free and open source cloud native service mesh developed by Microsoft that runs on Kubernetes.

Overview
OSM is written in the Go programming language and designed to be a reference implementation of the Service Mesh Interface (SMI) specification, a standard interface for service meshes on Kubernetes. The software is based on the Envoy proxy server and allows users to uniformly manage, secure, and get out-of-the-box observability features for highly dynamic microservice environments.

The source code is licensed under MIT License and available on GitHub. Microsoft plans to donate OSM to the Cloud Native Computing Foundation to ensure that it is community-led and has open governance.

See also

 Consul (software)
 Envoy (software)
 Helm (software)
 Linkerd
 Istio

References

External links
 
 GitHub - openservicemesh/osm

Free and open-source software
Microsoft free software
Software using the MIT license
2020 software